Gazoryctra mcglashani is a moth of the family Hepialidae. It is known from the United States, including California.

References

Moths described in 1886
Hepialidae
Moths of North America